The following page lists some of the power stations in Chile.

Coal

Gas

Hydroelectric

Wind farms

See also 

List of power stations in South America
List of largest power stations in the world

References 

Chile
 
Power stations